"Never Really Wanted" is a debut song co-written and recorded by American country music artist Eric Paslay. It was released on July 25, 2011 as the first single from Paslay's self-titled debut album.

Critical reception
Billy Dukes of Taste of Country gave the song a four-star review, saying that "The debut single from Eric Paslay is the cute but shy kid in class. It’s not going to sweep you off your feet the first time you lay ears on it. No, ‘Never Really Wanted’ is built for the long run. It’s a song you can fall in love with." Liv Carter of Urban Country News gave the song a "thumbs up", praising Paslay's vocals as well as the song's chorus. She summarized her review by saying that "So, country radio, do your thing and make this a solid hit. Eric Paslay already has Top 10 success as co-writer of Jake Owen‘s ‘Barefoot Blue Jean Night’. Now it’s time for him to stand in the spotlight all by himself.

Chart performance

References

2011 songs
2011 debut singles
Eric Paslay songs
EMI Records singles
Songs written by Eric Paslay
Songs written by Walt Aldridge
Song recordings produced by Marshall Altman